Saillac may refer to the following places in France:

Saillac, Corrèze, a commune in the department of Corrèze
Saillac, Lot, a commune in the department of Lot